Criticism has been directed at Tesco from various groups, including national organisations, trade bodies, individuals, consumer groups and watchdogs, particularly since the early 2000s.

Criticism of Tesco and related litigation
As with any large corporation, the Tesco supermarket chain is involved in litigation, usually from claims of personal injury from customers, claims of unfair dismissal from staff, and other commercial matters. Two notable cases were Ward v Tesco Stores Ltd, which set a precedent in so-called 'trip and slip' injury claims against retailers, and Tesco Supermarkets Ltd v Nattrass, which reached the House of Lords and became a leading case regarding the corporate liability of businesses for failures of their store managers (in a case of misleading advertising). Criticism of Tesco includes disapproval of the effects supermarket chains can have on farmers, suppliers and smaller competitors; along with claims of generally poor labour relations with its staff concerning sick leave regulations. Accusations concerning using cheap and/or child labour in Bangladesh amongst other places, have also arisen since the millennium.

Cases in the UK

Corporate policy

The UK's Competition Commission monopoly inquiry
In 2006, the Office of Fair Trading (OFT) referred the UK grocery market to the Competition Commission for a new inquiry.
In January 2007, the Competition Commission, published its initial findings into the UK grocery market. It said that they were "concerned with whether Tesco or any other supermarket can get into such a strong position, either nationally or locally, that no other retailer can compete effectively". It, however, found no actual basis for accusations that Tesco could use its land bank to control nearly half of national grocery retailing, and that suppliers' profits were being squeezed by the supermarket.

Tesco's 2004 Adminstore acquisition led to local and UK-wide protests. Tesco's other store openings and expansions are sometimes contested by campaign groups. When a company controls more than 25% of a business sector in the UK, it is usually blocked from buying other companies in that sector (but not from increasing its market share through organic growth). The Office of Fair Trading currently treats supermarkets and convenience stores as two distinct sectors—although this definition has been challenged by smaller retailers, including the Association of Convenience Stores.

Planning infringements and corporate "land bank" conspiracy theory
In February 2006, a group of UK MPs produced a report highlighting the near monopoly powers of the big four supermarkets. One problem discussed by the group was that of building without appropriate planning permission. The discussion stemmed from the company's building of a store in Stockport that was 20% larger than the company actually had permission to build. In September 2006, subsequent (retrospective) planning permission was requested by Tesco but refused.

Tesco Stores Ltd v Secretary of State for the Environment [1995] 1 W.L.R. 759; [1995] 2 All E.R. 636, deals with the Town and Country Planning Act 1990, where Tesco wanted to build a superstore outside Oxford.

Criticism of Tesco includes allegations of stifling competition due to its undeveloped "land bank", pugilistically aggressive new store development without real consideration of the wishes, needs and consequences to local communities, using cheap and/or child labour, opposition to its move into the convenience sector and breaching planning laws.

In April 2011, longstanding opposition to a Tesco Express store in Cheltenham Road, Stokes Croft, Bristol, evolved into a violent clash between opponents and police. The recently opened storefront was heavily damaged and the police reported the seizure of petrol bombs. Opponents such as No Tesco in Stokes Croft, have suggested that the store would damage small shops and harm the character of the area.

Pricing and advertising
The group has been criticised for its tactics, including allegedly misleading consumers with "phoney" price cuts. For example, advertising huge savings, when in fact they are only lowering the price of less popular items and raising the price of more popular goods.

In 2011, Tesco was fined £300,000 for misleading customers regarding the sale of strawberries. Trading Standards in Birmingham brought the case stating that £1.99 strawberries on sale in Sheldon, Birmingham, had not been for sale at £3.99 long enough. Tesco admitted misleading customers into believing that the strawberries on sale were genuinely "half price".

Trading relations with suppliers
Tesco is also censured by those who think that it infringes upon the interests of farmers and smaller suppliers. The company responds by claiming that it follows industry-best practice and sources locally where it can to meet customer demand. In March 2005, the Office of Fair Trading published an audit of the workings of its code of practice on relationships between supermarkets and their suppliers. It reported that no official complaints had been received against Tesco or any of the other major supermarkets, but the supermarkets' critics, including Friends of the Earth, contested that suppliers were prevented from complaining by fear of losing business, and called for more rigorous supervision of the supermarkets. A further report by the Office of Fair Trading in August 2005 concluded that the aims of the Code of Practice were being met.

In September 2006, Tesco came to an agreement with Tyrrells Crisps to stop selling grey market supplies. Tyrrells was founded by potato farmer Will Chase after big supermarkets' purchasing-power almost put his farm out of business. He started Tyrrells to gain greater margin by selling directly, and only sold through delicatessens and Waitrose supermarket. After Tesco bought supplies from the grey market, Chase sought legal advice but Tesco backed down.

Tesco has been subject to several claims of apparently out-of-date food being 'back-labelled' to appear still to be within date, and poor café hygiene

Tesco denied squeezing its suppliers in December 2013 after retail analyst Cantor Fitzgerald accused Tesco of practices that risked breaching the Groceries Supply Code of Practice and criticised its trading relationships. Similar accusations were also made in April 2005 despite its record £2,000,000,000 profit.

Labour relations
American union leaders, representing employees of Tesco's Fresh & Easy brand, have complained that a "stark contrast" exists between the way the supermarket chain treats their British workers and staff at their US business.

Customer privacy laws
In January 2005, Tesco faced criticism for their testing of RFID tags used to collect information on product movement in pilot stores. Critics label the tags "Spy Chips" and allege that they are to be used to collect information on customers' shopping habits.

Financial affairs

Taxation laws
In 2008 Tesco sued The Guardian for libel and malicious falsehood over the newspaper's claims that Tesco has developed a complex taxation structure involving offshore bank accounts in the tax haven of the Cayman Islands. The case was ultimately settled, with The Guardian issuing an apology.

SFO investigation into relations with the auditor PwC
In August, Tesco's financial management had announced that the firm's half-year dividend would be cut by 75% and full-year profits would be in the region of £2.4bn to £2.5bn, less than its previous revenue estimate of £2.8bn, and already £0.5bn down on last year's £3.3bn reported corporate profits.

The Serious Fraud Office launched a formal criminal probe into the auditing and accounting practices in mid 2014 and the Financial Reporting Council in December 2014. The US brokers JP Morgan claimed that the fiscal 'hole' in Tesco's accounts could be even worse than expected.
 	 	
The FRC decided to investigate auditor PwC for allegedly maliciously messing about with Tesco's accounts. on 22 December 2014.

The Serious Fraud Office (SFO) launched a criminal investigation into alleged accounting irregularities. Tesco said it had been "co-operating fully" with the SFO, who took matter out of the hands of the Financial Conduct Authority, the City's business regulator. The UK accountancy regulator, the Financial Reporting Council, was also reported to be monitoring Tesco. Tesco's auditor PwC declined to comment. It found that they were overstated by £118m in the first half of this year, by £70m in the 2013-2014 financial year and by £75m before that.

Warwick Business School's Prof Crawford Spence said: "Now that Tesco are being investigated for fraud by the SFO, the Financial Reporting Council have yet greater reason to start an investigation into the auditors' role with regard to these irregularities".

The accountancy firm Deloitte had launched investigation into Tesco's misreported profits a week earlier.

Tesco had suspended eight executives pending further enquiries by 18 October 2013, including the UK corporate boss Chris Bush, while an investigation into the scandal takes place. The firm is also withholding payments worth £2,000,000 to its former chief executive Philip Clarke and chief financial officer Laurie McIlwee.

Service levels

Clubcard

In January 2018, Tesco announced that all Clubcard points offers where points could be doubled or quadrupled would end. No notice was given to customers and Tesco faced a huge backlash. It then delayed the change to June 2018.

Product quality issues

February 2013 horse meat scandal

In 2013, DNA tests revealed that horse meat was present in some meat products sold in Findus and ABP Food Group ready meals.

On 7 February 2013, it was revealed by the Food Standards Agency that the Findus beef lasagne range in the UK, France and Sweden and the shepherd's pie and moussaka ranges in France contained horse meat without proper declaration or official scrutiny. The contamination may have gone on since summer 2012 according to a leaked document. Ready packed meal firm Findus, Compass Group was the world's biggest catering firm at the time, and Whitbread, which was Britain's biggest hotel group, were indicted for illegally selling concealed horse meat in food products.

As a result, Tesco's market capitalization dropped  on Wednesday 16 January 2013.

Tesco, the Co-operative Group and Aldi also decided to cancel contracts with ABP Food Group because of the adulteration.

In a public letter later that day, 11 firms, including Tesco and Asda, said they shared shoppers' "anger and outrage". Whitbread vowed to remedy the unacceptable situation on 26 February. The Food Standards Agency's (FSA) chief executive, Catherine Brown also said "it is unlikely we will ever know" how many unwittingly ate horse meat.

Food hygiene allegations
On 22 May 2007, the BBC's Whistleblower programme showed undercover footage detailing breaches of food hygiene rules in a branch of Tesco. The Whistleblower reporter applied for a job following a tip-off from a former employee. Breaches included the sale of products after their sell-by date; allegations that the company illegally and sold 'back-labelled' products after their use by date; falsification of temperature records; and the sale of partially cooked mince mixed with uncooked mince.

In addition to this the Food Safety Authority of Ireland, has on a number of occasions ordered the recall of Tesco branded products, including a case of glass contamination. Environmental Health Officers served a closure order on Tesco's store in Prussia Street, Dublin, the day after they inspected it, for a number of breaches of Food Hygiene Regulations.

Branches of Tesco and Sainsbury's were been subject to claims of apparently out-of-date food being 'back-labelled' to appear still to be within date.

Alleged health and safety issues

Secret sale of Brian Fords discount stores
In June 2008, it was revealed that Tesco had bought independent supermarket Brian Fords discount stores (with one store in Barnstaple, Devon, UK) five years previously, without notifying the public. Tesco submitted planning applications for a new supermarket early in 2008 under Brian Fords' name. The plans included a Brian Fords sign and North Devon Council were said to be unaware of the Tesco takeover. It was later revealed that a separate property company, Wixley Properties Ltd (which had zero employees and zero turnover) had actually bought the supermarket. Tesco said they were in control of Wixley Properties Ltd.

Fake farms
In March 2016 Tesco came under fire for branding products with fictional farms names. Later in the year the National Farmers Union lodged a complaint with Trading Standards over the matter.

Xenophobia

Romanians
On 21 November 2020, a member of the Romanian diaspora in the United Kingdom pointed out that in one of Tesco's stores in London, there was a warning for shoplifters written in the Romanian language that said "notice for store thieves, you will be legally prosecuted if caught stealing". The Romanian women posted this on Facebook and called it "blatantly racist and xenophobic". She requested the removal of the poster, a petition that was joined by the Romanian Ministry of Foreign Affairs (MAE), which expressed its "surprise and disagreement against the strongly discriminating message". The news went viral and were later published in Romanian media. According to the Office for National Statistics, the Romanians in the United Kingdom then formed a community of about 427,000, making them the fourth largest foreign group in the country at the time.

Overseas

Ireland
Tesco Ireland is the largest food retailer in Ireland, with over 13,500 employees.  Tesco Ireland has been criticised for apparently high prices in its Irish stores. This may be because comparisons are with the British Tesco stores rather than other Irish retailers – and thus like goods are not being compared with like. However, there have been general criticisms of the similar pricing between Irish supermarkets, and economic reports noting the high prices in Ireland generally. Research concluded that only a five per cent difference in the cost of goods between North and South was justifiable. The findings highlighted retailers' larger margins in the South vis-a-vis their operations in the North, and the Minister for Enterprise, Trade and Employment queried why the price differential in many identical goods was substantially in excess of 5%.

Tesco in Ireland was convicted of failing to properly display prices by the National Consumer Agency in July 2008.

A report by independent retailers group RGDATA contained allegations that Tesco overcharged customers. The report shows that customers in six Tesco stores were overcharged by an average of 3% on some items.

In 2001, Environmental Health Officers served a closure order on Tesco's store in Prussia Street, Dublin, for breaches of Food Hygiene Regulations.

The British-owned supermarket, refused to stock any of the one million postcards which are aimed at closing the controversial plant at Sellafield in Cumbria. Dunnes Stores and Superquinn, along with other retailers across the country, did sell the postcards.

In 2009, the Advertising Standards Authority determined Tesco's advertising was misleading. It claimed consumers could “save over 40%" but collectively the savings on the products advertised was less than 40%.

In 2006, Tesco apologised for selling copies of the antisemitic forgery The Protocols of the Elders of Zion. Sheikh Dr Shaheed Satardien, head of the Muslim Council of Ireland, described the sales as "polluting the minds of impressionable young Islamic people with hate and anger towards the Jewish community." Tesco also sold the material in the UK.

Bangladesh
In Autumn 2006, a Channel 4 News investigation found child labour in four Bangladesh garment factories supplying Tesco. Tesco stated "All suppliers to Tesco must demonstrate that they meet our ethical standards on worker welfare, which are closely monitored. Our suppliers comply with local labour laws, and workers at all Bangladeshi suppliers to Tesco are paid above the national minimum wage." Campaigners argued the minimum wage in Bangladesh is too low, and that monitoring systems used by clothing retailers, such as Tesco, are ineffective.

China
In September 2011, Greenpeace reported supermarkets in China, including Tesco, were selling vegetables that contained illegal pesticides or others at levels exceeding safe limits. Of 16 fruit and vegetable samples obtained from Tesco stores in Beijing and Guangzhou, 11 did not comply with regulations and one contained residues of methamidophos and monocrotophos, both of which had been prohibited since 2007.

In December 2019, the BBC alleged Tesco's supply chain in China included forced prison labour.

Hungary

In 2010, two KDFSZ trade union officials that had persuaded a fellow employee and his family to report a serious accident were dismissed by Tesco Hungary. Tesco claimed the officials had been "unethical and dishonest", and that they had "violated good faith and respectability". The Democratic Confederation of Free Trade Unions alleged Tesco breached Hungary's Labour Code requirements to consult with their trade union prior to the dismissals.

Thailand
In 2008, Thailand's Tesco Lotus associate sought penalties of two years in prison and a £16.4m libel damages from, writer and former legislator, Jit Siratranont after he argued it was expanding aggressively at the expense of small, local retailers. Authors including Joanne Harris, Marina Lewycka and Deborah Moggach urged Tesco to "impress your critics with the force of argument, not the threat of imprisonment". The criminal defamation and civil libel cases were dismissed by the Thai courts. Tesco Lotus brought similar actions against two other critics. It dropped one and settled the other in return for an apology.

See also
Tesco Town

References

External links
 Documents detail sale of Brian Ford's supermarket to Tesco
 Talking Tesco Tesco website arguing its ethical case.
 Tescopoly Nerve, 7 April 2006 	
 Supermarket Sweep Up Independent Blog.
 Tesco profile on Clean Up Fashion

Tesco
Tesco
Politics of the United Kingdom